The Museum of Modern Art of Republika Srpska is an art museum in Banja Luka, Republika Srpska, Bosnia and Herzegovina. The museum has rebranded itself in recent years as the Museum of Contemporary Art of Republika Srpska.

See also 
 List of museums in Bosnia and Herzegovina

Culture of Republika Srpska
Art museums and galleries in Bosnia and Herzegovina
Buildings and structures in Republika Srpska